Cooks Mills is an unincorporated community in Coles County, Illinois, United States.

Notable person
Cal Crum, professional baseball player for the Boston Braves

References

Unincorporated communities in Coles County, Illinois
Unincorporated communities in Illinois